The Moscow–Brest Railway is about 1,100 km of Moscow Railway within Russian Railways and Belarusian Railway, that connects between Moscow in Russia and Brest near at the Polish border. It was built during the period of Imperial Russia.

History 

The construction of Moscow–Smolensk railway was approved by Alexander II On December 15, 1868. Construction began in the spring of 1869 with the construction of the Moscow Smolensk railway station at the Tverskaya Zastava Square.
This railway was built simultaneously from Smolensk and from Moscow. On August 9, 1870, the first trains passed from Smolensk to Gzhatsk. On September 20, 1870, Moscow-Smolensk Railway was opened. In 1870–1871, the Smolensk-Brest railway was built, and this section was opened on November 16, 1871. 
Both railways merged into one and they were named the Moscow–Brest Railway. In 1877–1879, from Moscow to Kubinka, and from Smolensk to Brest became double-track sections. In 1891–1892, from Kubinka to Smolensk became a double-track section.
Electrification began in 1941 and by 1973 between Moscow and Vyazma was electrified at 3,000 V direct current. In 1979 ahead of the Moscow Olympic Games the rest of the Vyazma–Brest was electrified at 50 Hz 25,000 V.

Major stations
Moscow (Belorussky) - Vyazma - Smolensk - Orsha - Minsk - Stoŭbcy - Baranovichi - Brest

In popular culture
The Moscow–Brest Railway plays a role in the novel Doctor Zhivago by Boris Pasternak.

See also

 List of railway lines in Russia

References

Railway lines in Russia
Railway lines in Belarus